The Huitong Covered Bridge is a covered bridge over the Juanshui Stream in Shatian Township of Ningxiang, Hunan, China. It was listed on the "Cultural Relics Protection Units in Hunan Province" on October 10, 1983.

History
The Huitong Covered Bridge was built in 1883 in the late Qing dynasty (1644–1911). The bridge is made of blue bricks and stone. The bridge is engraved with centipedes, the natural enemy of snakes and dragons, symbolizing relief from floods. Ancient Chinese people believed that floods were caused by dragons. In front of the bridge, a wooden plaque with a couplet is hung on the two side pillars. It was written by Qing dynasty scholar Yue Haodong.

In 1914 and 1917, Mao Zedong and He Shuheng talked twice on the bridge.

On October 10, 1983, it has been designated as a Cultural Relics Protection Unit in Hunan Province by the Hunan Provincial Government.

Gallery

References 

Bridges completed in 1883
Covered bridges in China
Road bridges in China
Buildings and structures in Ningxiang